Ahmed Abdelkader is the name of three footballers:

 Ahmed Abdelkader (footballer, born 1986), Libyan footballer
 Ahmed Abdelkader (footballer, born 1999), French-Algerian footballer
 Ahmed Abdel Kader (born 1999), Egyptian footballer